Dniprovske is an urban-type settlement in Kamianske Raion of Dnipropetrovsk Oblast in Ukraine. Dniprovske is located on the right bank of the Dnieper (the Kamianske Reservoir), between Kamianske and Verkhnodniprovsk. It belongs to Verkhnodniprovsk urban hromada, one of the hromadas of Ukraine. Population: 

Until 18 July 2020, Dniprovske belonged to Verkhnodniprovsk Raion. The raion was abolished in July 2020 as part of the administrative reform of Ukraine, which reduced the number of raions of Dnipropetrovsk Oblast to seven. The area of Verkhnodniprovsk Raion was merged into Kamianske Raion.

Economy

Transportation
The closest railway station, Verkhnodniprovsk, is located in Novomykolaivka. It is on the railway connecting Kamianske and Kryvyi Rih.

Dniprovske has access to Highway H08 which connects Kamianske and Kremenchuk.

References

Urban-type settlements in Kamianske Raion
Populated places on the Dnieper in Ukraine